Smith v. Goguen, 415 U.S. 566 (1974), is a United States Supreme Court case in which the Court held that flag desecration laws that prohibit "contemptuous" treatment of the flag are overly broad.

Background 
Goguen, a teenager from Massachusetts, was arrested by police for wearing a small cloth US flag on the seat of his pants. When arrested, Goguen was standing on the sidewalk, talking; he was not engaged in any demonstration.  Goguen was convicted and sentenced to 6 months in jail for violating a flag desecration law encompassing anyone who treats the flag "contemptuously". His conviction was upheld by the Massachusetts Supreme Court. Assisted by the ACLU, Goguen appealed to the Federal court, and the Federal court overturned his conviction.  Massachusetts appealed to the US Supreme Court.

Opinion of the Court 
The Supreme Court, in a 6 to 3 decision, sided with Goguen, and ruled that the statute was too vague.   The Court partially relied on prior decisions which prohibited states from compelling people to salute the flag:   "neither the United States nor any State may require any individual to salute or express favorable attitudes toward the flag."

See also 
 West Virginia Board of Education v. Barnette, 319 U.S. 624 (1943)
 Stromberg v. California, 283 U.S. 359 (1931)

External links
 

1974 in United States case law
American Civil Liberties Union litigation
United States Supreme Court cases
United States Supreme Court cases of the Burger Court
Flag controversies in the United States